Deiopea  may refer to:
 Deiopea (ctenophore), a genus of ctenophores (comb jellies) in the family Eurhamphaeidae

Greek mythology
Deiopea (mythology), two characters in Greek mythology:
 Deiopea, one of the Nereids
 Deiopea, a nymph that Juno promised in marriage to Aeolus if he would unleash his winds against Aeneas